Susan A. Geertshuis is an English-New Zealand academic. She is currently a full professor at the University of Auckland.

Academic career
After a PhD at the University of Nottingham, she worked at the University of Wales Bangor and the University of Northampton, before moving to the University of Auckland, rising to full professor.

Selected works
 Geertshuis, Susan, Mary Holmes, Harry Geertshuis, David Clancy, and Amanda Bristol. "Evaluation of workplace learning." Journal of Workplace Learning 14, no. 1 (2002): 11–18.
 Geertshuis, Susan A., Rachel L. Morrison, and Helena D. Cooper-Thomas. "It’s not what you say, it’s the way that you say it: The mediating effect of upward influencing communications on the relationship between leader-member exchange and performance ratings." International Journal of Business Communication 52, no. 2 (2015): 228–245.
 Sambrook, Sally, Susan Geertshuis, and David Cheseldine. "Developing a quality assurance system for computer-based learning materials: Problems and issues." Assessment & Evaluation in Higher Education 26, no. 5 (2001): 417–426.
 Geertshuis, Susan A., and John A. Fazey. "Approaches to learning in the workplace." Journal of Workplace Learning 18, no. 1 (2006): 55–65.
 Geertshuis, Susan. "Improving decision making for sustainability: a case study from New Zealand." International Journal of Sustainability in Higher Education 10, no. 4 (2009): 379–389.

References

External links
  

Living people
New Zealand women academics
Alumni of the University of Nottingham
Academic staff of the University of Auckland
Academics of Bangor University
Academics of the University of Northampton
New Zealand psychologists
New Zealand women psychologists
New Zealand educational theorists
Year of birth missing (living people)
New Zealand women writers